Doissin is a commune in the department of Isère  in southeastern France.

Geography
The main villages are: Bouis, Eynoud the Lutheau the Rousset, Trièves and the Marquisière.

Transportation
The nearest airport is GNB - Grenoble Saint Geoirs, located 16.7 km southwest of Doissin. The larger international airport LYS - Lyon Saint Exupery is 35.8 km northwest.

Population

See also
Communes of the Isère department

References

Communes of Isère